The Black Book is a collage-like book compiled by Toni Morrison published by Random House in 1974, which explores the history and experience of African Americans in the United States through various historic documents, facsimiles, artwork, obituaries, advertisements, patent applications, photographs, sheet music, and more.

The book was co-edited by Roger Furman, Middleton A. Harris, Morris Levitt, and Ernest Smith, and features an introduction by Bill Cosby. Toni Morrison, who was then an editor at Random House, was The Black Books uncredited compiler, and a poem by her appeared on the book's slipcover. Morrison said it was important to include documents such as patents to demonstrate that African Americans were "busy, smart and not just minstrelized".

The Black Book was nominated for a 1975 National Book Award, and received an award from the American Institute of Graphic Arts.

In 2009, Random House published a 35th anniversary edition of The Black Book, containing Morrison's poem as the preface.

References

Books about African-American history
1974 books
Random House books
Works by Toni Morrison